Youssouf Yalike (born 17 January 1999) is an Ivorian footballer who plays for Spanish club Deportivo Fabril as a central midfielder.

Club career
Born in Abidjan, Yalike joined Levante UD in 2017 from locals Arras Football Association, signing his first contract with the club on 22 May. Initially assigned to the Juvenil squad, he made his debut with the reserves on 18 November by coming on as late substitute for Javi Llor in a 3–0 Tercera División away win against CD Olímpic de Xàtiva.

Yalike made his first team debut on 28 November 2017, replacing Jason in a 1–1 home draw against Girona FC, for the season's Copa del Rey. The following 22 August, he joined fourth division side CF Torre Levante on a one-year loan deal.

References

External links

1999 births
Living people
Footballers from Abidjan
Ivorian footballers
Ivorian expatriate footballers
Association football midfielders
Tercera División players
Atlético Levante UD players
Levante UD footballers
CF Torre Levante players
Deportivo Fabril players
Ivorian expatriate sportspeople in Spain
Expatriate footballers in Spain